The Jagdsinfonie or Sinfonia da Caccia for 4 Horns and Strings is a work by Leopold Mozart in the key of G major. It is scored for corni di caccia, or hunting horns, strings, and gunshots, a naturalism not atypical of this composer. Some performances add the recorded sounds of shouts and barking dogs.

There are 3 movements:
 Allegro
 Andante più tosto un poco allegretto a gusto d'un Echo
 Menuetto

Sources

 Archive of the Gesellschaft der Musikfreunde, Vienna (ms. nr. 13/23533)
 Fürstlich Öttingen-Wallersteinsche Bibliothek in Harburg (ms. nr. III, 4°, 1/2 4 537)

External links
 
 Free score, incl. parts, kantoreiarchiv.de

Compositions by Leopold Mozart
Mozart Leopold Jagdsinfonie
Compositions in G major